Gravdalstinden is a mountain on the border of Luster Municipality in Vestland county and Lom Municipality in Innlandet county, Norway. The mountain is surrounded by several other notable mountains including Fannaråki to the west; Smørstabbtindene, Storebjørn, Veslebjørn, Sokse, and Kniven to the north; Stetinden and Stehøi to the northeast; and Høgvagltindene and Kyrkja to the east.

See also
List of mountains of Norway by height

References

Jotunheimen
Lom, Norway
Luster, Norway
Mountains of Vestland
Mountains of Innlandet